Oecomys rex, also known as the regal oecomys or king arboreal rice rat, is a species of rodent in the genus Oecomys of family Cricetidae. It is found in Guyana, Suriname, French Guiana, and nearby parts of Venezuela and Brazil.

References

Literature cited
Catzeflis, F. and Percequillo, A. 2008. . In IUCN. IUCN Red List of Threatened Species. Version 2009.2. <www.iucnredlist.org>. Downloaded on December 2, 2009.
Musser, G.G. and Carleton, M.D. 2005. Superfamily Muroidea. Pp. 894–1531 in Wilson, D.E. and Reeder, D.M. (eds.). Mammal Species of the World: a taxonomic and geographic reference. 3rd ed. Baltimore: The Johns Hopkins University Press, 2 vols., 2142 pp. 

Oecomys
Mammals described in 1910
Taxa named by Oldfield Thomas